Carrick, Cumnock and Doon Valley was a county constituency represented in the House of Commons of the Parliament of the United Kingdom from 1983 until 2005. Half of the constituency was incorporated into the new Ayr, Carrick and Cumnock constituency, with the remainder incorporated into the new Central Ayrshire constituency and the expanded Kilmarnock and Loudoun constituency.

Boundaries
1983–1997: Cumnock and Doon Valley District, and the Kyle and Carrick District electoral divisions of Annbank Mossblown and St Quivox, Carrick, and Coylton and Kincaidston.

1997–2005: Cumnock and Doon Valley District, and the Kyle and Carrick District electoral divisions of Ayr South Coylton and Annbank, and Carrick.

History
The Carrick, Cumnock and Doon Valley constituency was created as part of the Third Periodical Review of Parliamentary constituencies in 1983. It was a direct successor to the former South Ayrshire constituency which covered the modern electoral wards of Doon Valley, Cumnock & New Cumnock, Ballochmyle, Girvan & South Carrick and Maybole, North Carrick & Coylton alongside Annbank which forms part of the Kyle electoral ward. The new constituency stretched across the former South Ayrshire constituency whilst also incorporating the council estate of Kincaidston in Ayr and a large, unpopulated section of Prestwick, east of Prestwick airport.

Significant boundary change took place as part of the Fourth Periodical Review in time for the 1997 general election. Large swathes of the Ayr constituency were transferred to the Carrick, Cumnock and Doon Valley constituency, altering the demographic of both seats. The Conservative-voting suburbs of Alloway, Doonfoot, Castlehill, Masonhill and Holmston were incorporated into Carrick, Cumnock and Doon Valley alongside the council estates of south Belmont and part of Forehill. The east section of Prestwick which was previously contained within Carrick, Cumnock and Doon Valley was transferred back to Ayr.

For the 2005 general election the Carrick, Cumnock and Doon Valley constituency was divided into three constituencies, with Mossblown, Annbank and St. Quivox forming part of the Central Ayrshire constituency alongside Irvine, Kyle, Prestwick, Troon and part of Ayr (Heathfield) and Kilwinning. The Ballochmyle electoral ward was added to Kilmarnock and Loudoun whilst the remainder of the constituency was joined to the Labour-Conservative marginal town of Ayr to form the Ayr, Carrick and Cumnock seat. These boundaries currently remain in place today.

Constituency profile and voting patterns

Members of Parliament
As South Ayrshire:

As Carrick, Cumnock and Doon Valley:

Elections

Elections of the 1980s

Elections of the 1990s

Elections of the 2000s

References 

Historic parliamentary constituencies in Scotland (Westminster)
Constituencies of the Parliament of the United Kingdom established in 1983
Constituencies of the Parliament of the United Kingdom disestablished in 2005
Dalmellington
Cumnock
Politics of South Ayrshire
Politics of East Ayrshire